Ephrin-B3 is a protein that in humans is encoded by the EFNB3 gene.

EFNB3, a member of the ephrin gene family, is important in brain development as well as in its maintenance. The EPH and EPH-related receptors comprise the largest subfamily of receptor protein-tyrosine kinases. EPH receptors typically have a single kinase domain and an extracellular region containing a Cysteine-rich domain and 2 fibronectin type III repeats. The ephrin ligands and receptors have been named by the Eph Nomenclature Committee (1997) based on their structures and sequence relationships. Ephrins are divided into the ephrin-A (EFNA) class, which are anchored to the membrane by a glycosylphosphatidylinositol linkage, and the ephrin-B (EFNB) class, which are transmembrane proteins. Ephrin-B ligands also contain an intracellular tail with highly conserved tyrosine residues and a PDZ-binding motif at the C-terminus.  This tail functions as a mechanism for reverse signaling, where signaling occurs into the ligand-containing cell, as opposed to the cell with the receptor. Upon receptor-ligand interaction the tyrosine residues become phosphorylated and there is recruitment of PDZ domain-containing proteins. The Eph family of receptors are similarly divided into two groups based on the similarity of their extracellular domain sequences and their affinities for binding ephrin-A and ephrin-B ligands.
EphrinB3 has been implicated in mediating various developmental events, particularly in the nervous system. EphrinB3 reverse signaling is important for axon pruning and synapse and spine formation during postnatal development of the nervous system.  Previous work has also shown that signaling through this ligand is important for radial migration during cortical development. Moreover, levels of EFNB3 expression are particularly high in several forebrain subregions compared to other brain subregions, and may play a pivotal role in forebrain function. It has been suggested that ephrinB3 signaling is necessary for synaptic plasticity to occur in the hippocampus; this implicates ephrinB3 as a major player in learning and memory. More recently, ephrinB3 has been shown to regulate proliferation of neural stem cells in the adult subventricular zone (SVZ).

References

Further reading